Christine Pai is a former Chinese actress from Hong Kong. Pai is credited with over 35 films.

Early life 
On January 6, 1937. Pai was born as Hui Lai-king in Hong Kong.

Career 
In 1955, Pai joined Tai Seng (Dasheng) Film Company and became an actress in Hong Kong films. Pai first appeared in Now That I've Got a Daughter, Everything's O.K. with Yam Kim-fai, a 1955 Comedy film directed by Chiang Wai-Kwong. Pai was known for her appearance in Cantonese Drama, Comedy, Martial Arts, and Cantonese opera. Pai appeared in Spring Breeze Brings Back the Returned Swallow (aka The One Came Home), a 1958 Cantonese opera film directed by Wong Hok-Sing. Pai appeared in Bitter Lotus (Part 1 and Part 2), a 1960 Drama film directed by Wong Toi. Pai appeared as Chang Li-Chen in The Greatest Civil War on Earth, a 1961 Comedy film directed Wong Tin-Lam. Pai's last film was Mistaken Love, a 1966 Comedy film Wong Tin-Lam. Pai is credited with over 35 films.

Filmography

Films 
This is a partial list of films.
 1955 Now That I've Got a Daughter, Everything's O.K.
 1960 Bitter Lotus (Part 1 and Part 2)
 1960 Second Spring 
 1961 The Greatest Civil War on Earth – Chang Li-Chen 
 1961 The Song of the Nightingale  
 1962 The Greatest Wedding on Earth – Lai/Pui-Ming 
 1964 The Greatest Love Affair on Earth 
 1966 Mistaken Love 
 1972 The Human Goddess

References

External links 
 Louming Bai at imdb.com
 Christine Pai Lu Ming at hkcinemagic.com
 Bai Luming at dianying.com
 Bai in Historical Dictionary of Hong Kong Cinema, page 25, By Lisa Odham Stokes, Rachel Braaten

1937 births
Hong Kong film actresses
Living people